Songavazzo is a comune (municipality) in the Province of Bergamo in the Italian region of Lombardy, located about  northeast of Milan and about  northeast of Bergamo.

Songavazzo borders the following municipalities: Bossico, Castione della Presolana, Cerete, Costa Volpino, Fino del Monte, Onore, Rogno, Rovetta.

Demographic evolution

References